United Nations Security Council resolution 1027, adopted unanimously on 30 November 1995, after recalling previous resolutions including Resolution 983 (1995) on Macedonia, the Council extended the mandate of the United Nations Preventive Deployment Force (UNPREDEP) until 30 May 1996.

The Security Council reaffirmed its commitment of the independence, sovereignty and territorial integrity of Macedonia and reiterated concern about any developments that could threaten its stability. In this regard, the mandate of UNPREDEP was extended until 30 May 1996 and urged it to continue co-operation with the Organization for Security and Co-operation in Europe. Requests from the Secretary-General to provide assistance to UNPREDEP were asked to be considered favourably. By 31 January 1996, the Secretary-General Boutros Boutros-Ghali was requested to report to the Council concerning any developments affecting the mandate of UNPREDEP.

See also
 Bosnian War
 Breakup of Yugoslavia
 Croatian War of Independence
 List of United Nations Security Council Resolutions 1001 to 1100 (1995–1997)
 Yugoslav Wars

References

External links
 
Text of the Resolution at undocs.org

 1027
 1027
1995 in Yugoslavia
1995 in the Republic of Macedonia
 1027
November 1995 events